Cheruvadi is a village in the Kozhikode district of Kerala. It is located 24 kilometres east of Kozhikode.

Climate
Cheruvadi has a humid and hot climate extending from March to May. The rain starts from June, lasting up to October. The North East Monsoon extends from the second half of October through November. The average annual rainfall is 3313 mm. The best weather is at the end of the year, in December and January, when the sky is clear and the air is crispy. The highest temperature recorded was 37.4 °C in March 2017. The lowest was 14 °C recorded on 26 December 1922.

Nearby places
Mukkam 7 km
Kunnamangalam 14 km
koduvally 14 km
NIT Calicut 9 km
Mavoor 4.4 km
Areakode 11 km
Thamarasseri 21 km
Kozhikode 24 km
Calicut International Airport 27 km
Kozhikode Railway Station 26 km

Transport

Cheruvadi is well connected Road network and Bus route with near by towns Mukkam, Mavoor, Edavannapara Thamarassery, Omassery, Kunnamangalam, Areekode, and Calicut.

There is no direct railway line that connects Cheruvadi with other cities. The nearest railway station is Kozhikode Railway Station which is about 26 kilometres from Cheruvadi. People who wish to visit Cheruvadi can reach Calicut by train and then proceed by road through Mavoor and Medical College.

Calicut International Airport, situated to the 27 km southwest of Cheruvadi, is the primary airport serving the northern Kerala. People from this region mainly depend on this international airport for their domestic as well as international travel. Calicut airport ranks as the 12th busiest airport in India in terms of overall passenger traffic. People from Cheruvadi region could reach this airport via Cheruvadi -Pazamparamba-Edavannappara route and it takes less than 40 minutes.

References
 

Villages in Kozhikode district